Gushkara Mahavidyalaya, established in 1965, is one of the oldest college in Guskara, Purba Bardhaman district. It offers undergraduate courses in arts, commerce and sciences. It is affiliated to  University of Burdwan.

Departments

Science

Chemistry
Phhysics
Mathematics
Botany
Zoology

Arts and Commerce

Bengali
English
Sanskrit
History
Geography
Political Science
Philosophy
Economics
Commerce

Accreditation
The college is recognized by the University Grants Commission (UGC).

See also

References

External links
Gushkara Mahavidyalaya

Colleges affiliated to University of Burdwan
Educational institutions established in 1965
Universities and colleges in Purba Bardhaman district
1965 establishments in West Bengal